James Campbell Elliott  (11 June 1928 – 12 February 2011) alternately James Eliott and Elliot James, was a Scottish-born Australian radio, theatre, television and film actor and best known for his appearances in both telefilms and serials, especially as an original character in the 1970s television soap opera Number 96, as Alf Sutcliffe opposite co-star Elisabeth Kirkby who played his wife Lucy Sutcliffe

Biography

James Campbell Elliott was born in  Glasgow, Scotland the second of 5 children to John Elliott and Katherine Campbell, and grew up in the Kelvinbridge area he was an original cast member of television soap opera  Number 96 which premiered March 1972. The show became Australia's highest-rated television program in 1973 and 1974. Alf and his wife Lucy (Elisabeth Kirkby) were immigrants from Yorkshire, England and Alf was presented as an archetypal "whinging Pom" who complained constantly about Australia while proving himself incapable of holding down a job. He also endured Lucy's series of dramatic health concerns which included a breast cancer scare, blindness, and an unplanned pregnancy followed by a troubled birth, where he proved himself somewhat kind and understanding. In late 1973 the show had a feature film spin-off featuring much of the show's current cast, including both Elliott and Kirkby, reprising their television roles.

Prior to Number 96 Elliott who had emigrated from Scotland to Australia in December 1949, had acted in Australian radio plays and serials, made several guest appearances in Australian television series including Consider Your Verdict and The Link Men, and he played Guildenstern in an Australian Broadcasting Corporation television production of the play Hamlet—this production being the first Shakespearean drama produced on Australian television. Other Shakespearean roles included Capulet in Romeo and Juliet for the Sydney University Players, and a supporting role in an Australian Broadcasting Corporation television production of The Tempest. Elliott also had a role in the feature film Ned Kelly (1970).

Despite once describing the serial as "instant television", Elliott played in Number 96 continuously for almost four years. In October 1975 Alf and Lucy were written out of Number 96 as part of a drastic remodelling of the show in the wake of declining ratings. Elliott subsequently made guest appearances on Australian drama series such as Solo One (1976), Glenview High (1977), Chopper Squad (1978), played in three episodes of legal drama Case for the Defence (1978), and later appeared in an episode of crime drama Bellamy (1981). He also acted in feature films Summer City (1977), Money Movers (1978), Little Boy Lost (1978), Lady Stay Dead (1981), Brothers (1982).

He briefly interrupted his career from 1982 until 1999 as he served as a Tipstaff, who worked for a Supreme Court Judge. Later television guest appearances included Home and Away credited as Elliot James and three episodes of medical drama All Saints, in 2001 and 2003 and film Running with the Boys.

Personal life

James Elliott died peacefully from Dementia with Lewy bodies disease on 12 February 2011. He was survived by two sons Greg and Doug with his first wife Mary McDonald whom he married in 1959, and one son James Elliott Jnr. by his second wife Elaine Minchin whom he married in 1980. He was honoured in the "In memorial" section of the Logie Awards in 2012

Filmography (selected)

References

External links

1928 births
2011 deaths
Australian male stage actors
Australian male television actors
Scottish emigrants to Australia
Male actors from Glasgow
Deaths from dementia in Australia
Deaths from Lewy body dementia